Col Thornton (8 May 1927 – 12 September 2005) was an Australian rules footballer who played with North Melbourne and St Kilda in the Victorian Football League (VFL).

Thornton was a follower, recruited to North Melbourne from Kensington and Coburg Amateurs. He had his first full season in 1950 and finished the year with an appearance in the 1950 VFL Grand Final, the first in the club's history. Thornton was the ruckman of the team but it was his opponent Bob McClure who would finish in the winning side.

Despite playing all 18 games in 1951, Thornton spent most of the 1952 and 1953 seasons in the reserves. He was granted a clearance to St Kilda in the 1954 pre-season but played just six senior games at his new club, where he was coached by former North Melbourne teammate Les Foote.

References

1927 births
Australian rules footballers from Victoria (Australia)
North Melbourne Football Club players
St Kilda Football Club players
2005 deaths